Forrest I. Phelps (June 10, 1853 – October 24, 1918) was an American politician in the state of Washington. He served in the Washington House of Representatives.

References

Members of the Washington House of Representatives
1853 births
1918 deaths
Washington (state) Populists
19th-century American politicians
People from Kelso, Washington